Frank Dietrich (born 20 September 1965 in Freiburg im Breisgau) is a German rower. Together with Michael Twittmann he finished 7th in the coxless pair at the 1988 Summer Olympics.

External links
 
 
 

1965 births
Living people
German male rowers
Sportspeople from Freiburg im Breisgau
Rowers at the 1988 Summer Olympics
Olympic rowers of West Germany
World Rowing Championships medalists for West Germany